Bullet is a 1999 Philippine action film co-written and directed by Cesar Montano on his directorial debut, who stars as the title role.

The film is streaming online on YouTube.

Cast

 Cesar Montano as Bullet
 Sunshine Cruz as Mabel
 Jay Manalo
 Celia Rodriguez
 Amy Austria
 Rommel Montano
 Daniella
 Rufa Mae Quinto
 Jethro Dionisio
 Spanky Manikan
 Cris Vertido
 Precious Valencia
 Don Pepot
 Christian Alvear
 Eugene Domingo
 Ina Alegre
 G-Boy Singson
 Rico Miguel
 Christian Angelo Montano
 Marissa Sanchez
 P.J. Oreta
 Papa Guchi
 Cris Aguilar
 Jet Alcantara
 Jon Antonio
 Tessie Villarama

References

External links

Full Movie on Viva Films

1999 films
1999 action films
Filipino-language films
Philippine action films
Viva Films films
Films directed by Cesar Montano